Guys Next Door is an American sketch comedy television series aired on NBC in the 1990–1991 season as part of its Saturday morning lineup. It featured a boy band performing comedy sketches and spoofs, as a combination of New Kids on the Block with The Monkees. The show starred Patrick J. Dancy, Eddie Garcia, Bobby Leslie, Damon Sharpe, and Chris Wolf.  Several Music Videos were created for the individual episodes which were produced by Joseph Sassone and directed by Dominic Orlando.  Production manager Jack Edward Sawyers and Ed Flores served as Post Production Supervisor for Mark Freedman Productions.

As a band, the group was signed to SBK/EMI records with a lone self-titled album, which spawned a Billboard Hot 100 single, "I've Been Waiting for You".

The Guys Next Door still have several fan websites and most of the group's music videos from the show are on YouTube.

While Wolf and Leslie dropped out of the public eye after the show ended, Dancy and Garcia are still active as actors.  Sharpe is currently a music producer and songwriter who has worked with such talents as Jennifer Lopez, Kylie Minogue, Anastacia, Kelly Rowland, Big Time Rush, New Boyz, and Monica.

References

External links 
 
 Website

NBC original programming
1990 American television series debuts
1991 American television series endings
1990s American children's comedy television series
1990s American musical comedy television series
1990s American sketch comedy television series
Children's sketch comedy
English-language television shows
American boy bands
Television series by Universal Television